Yengeh Qaleh-ye Havadanlu (also Romanized as Yengeh Qal‘eh-ye Havadānlū) is a village in Sudlaneh Rural District, in the Central District of Quchan County, Razavi Khorasan Province, Iran. At the 2006 census, its population was 526, in 126 families.

References 

Populated places in Quchan County